A View to a Kill is a 1985 role-playing game adventure for James Bond 007 published by Victory Games.

Plot summary
The player characters contend with Max Zorin, owner of Zorin Enterprises, as he tries to gain worldwide control of microchip production.

Reception
Steve Crow reviewed A View to a Kill in Space Gamer No. 76. Crow commented that "the only possible reasons I could see to buy A View to a Kill are a) if you want to pick up on all the things you missed or were confused about in the movie and no one gets around to novelizing it (yes, folks, it follow the movie's script that exactly); b) if you want to play out the exact sequence of the move and, as a halfway-competent gamemaster, can't design an adventure based on the movie yourself; or c) you want to have a complete collection of 007 modules and accessories."

Reviews
Adventurer #1 (April, 1986)
 Casus Belli #31 (Feb 1986)

References

James Bond 007 (role-playing game) adventures
Role-playing game supplements introduced in 1985